Christophe Kinet (born 15 May 1979) is a Belgian former footballer who played as a midfielder. He played in the Belgian, British, French and Dutch league for, among others Millwall F.C., Sparta Rotterdam, RC Strasbourg, FC Brussels and RFC Liège.

Career
Born in Huy, Belgium, Kinet started his youth training at R.S.C. Anderlecht. He quit Anderlecht for studies.

He joined Millwall F.C. in 2000, then playing in the second league and left Millwall again in 2002, only to be brought back shortly afterwards. One of his most memorable moments at Millwall was scoring a hat-trick against Northampton in the Football League Trophy.

In the 2004–05 winter transfer window Kinet transferred from FC Brussels to Sparta Rotterdam. During the 2005–06 season, he transferred to then third division club RFC de Liege, after Roeselare expressed initial interest.

Personal life
Kinet left Millwall because his then-girlfriend was expecting a baby. Kinet returned to Belgium and became the father of a son, named Henrick.

Honours
Germinal Ekeren
 Belgian Cup: 1996–97

References

External links
 
 
 

1979 births
Living people
Association football midfielders
Belgian footballers
Millwall F.C. players
Sparta Rotterdam players
RC Strasbourg Alsace players
Belgian Pro League players
English Football League players
Eerste Divisie players
Ligue 1 players
Belgian expatriate footballers
Expatriate footballers in England
Expatriate footballers in France
Expatriate footballers in the Netherlands
People from Huy
Footballers from Liège Province